Amirat is a commune in the Alpes-Maritimes department in southeastern France.

Geography
This little village is made up of three quarters:
The Agots, with the church and the hostel.
Amirat village, where the mayor's office is located.
Maupoil, location of the 16th century Saint Jeannet's Chapel.

Politics
Amirat had the fourth highest percentage of people who voted for Jean-Marie Le Pen of all French communes during the second round of voting in 2002 - 59.26%.

Population
The commune's inhabitants are known as Amiratois.

Sights
Saint Jeannet's Chapel, a 16th-century chapel with lovely wooden gate in Maupoil.

See also
Communes of the Alpes-Maritimes department

References

External links

 Official site (French)

Communes of Alpes-Maritimes